Alfred Ost (14 February 1884, Zwijndrecht – 9 October 1945, Antwerp) was a Belgian artist. In 1920 he won a bronze medal in the art competitions of the Olympic Games for his painting Joueur de Football (Football Player).

During the Second World War he found it difficult to align himself with the rationing system for food and other goods. He often lost his war-coupons for food and life necessities. He found shelter, food, and help exchanging his coupons with the Jesuit priests managing the Xaverius College in Borgerhout, Antwerp. In exchange for the help, he offered a piece of work of a religious nature. The Jesuits liked the work and ordered another, this time above the entrance of one of the doors leading to a chapel. As there were many positive reactions and a lot of fascination with the style, power, and dynamism of his art, he was offered to make drawings on all the walls all over the college. The artwork depicts the life of Francis Xavier, the patron saint of Xaverius College and Jesuit of the Jesuit order managing the college. Because of the war, there was no paint available, so his wall drawings was made with charcoal and woodcoal sticks. Much later on a protective layer was added and today the paintings still stand as one of the prides of the college.

References

Bibliography
 M. Bafcop, Mechelen in het oeuvre van A. Ost, Mechelen, 1980
 Paul van Crombruggen, Bloemen uit den Besloten Hof, with plates by Alfred Ost, Pierredirix, Antwerpen, 1940(?)
 Pol De Mont, De schilderkunst in België van 1830 tot 1921, 's-Gravenhage, 1921
 A. De Neef, Een rondleiding langs de muurtekeningen van Alfred Ost in het Xaveriuscollege te Borgerhout, 1971
 Léopold Godenne, Les Processions Cortèges - Calvalcades De Malines, Willy Godenne, Bruxelles, 48 pp, 1938
 H. J. Haverkate, Alfred Ost - het Vlaamse genie, Ons Amsterdam 41, pp 166–186, 1889
 Bart Huysmans, Alfred Ost, Amssoms Wilrijk, 40 pp, 1991
 Jan Mercelis, Lithographie: tentoonstelling plakkaten, Hoogstraten, 1984
 Jan Mercelis and R. Raymaekers, Alfred Ost 1884-1945, Brussel, 1988
 Jan Mercelis (conservator Stedelijk Museum te Hoogstraten), Ost-info, quarterly publication 1984–2006, 82 issues
 Frans Mertens, Alfred Ost, verheerlijken en beveiliger van het Mechelse Stede- en Monumentenschoon, Handelingen van de Kon. Kring voor Oudheidkunde, Letteren en Kunst van Mechelen 66, pp. 157-176, 1962
 Frans Mertens, Alfred Ost, Uitgeverij De Vroente, Kasterlee, 1971, 336 pp.
 Frans Mertens, Geïllustreerde inventaris van tekeningen, aquarellen en plakkaten, Alfred Ostzaal, Koninklijke Maatschappij voor Dierkunde van Antwerpen, 1971
 Frans Mertens, De legendarische Ost, Liber Amicorum Jozef Lauwerys, Hoogstraten, 88 pp., 1973 (with 40 illustrations in colour)

 R. van Passen, Kunstschilder Alfred Ost, Leuven, 1947
 J. Philippen, De bedevaartvaantjes van Alfred Ost, quarterly publication De Brabantse Folklore, March 1983, nr 237, pp. 20–54 (9 black and white illustrations including a photo of Alfred Ost)
 G. Prieels, De vrouw in het oeuvre van A. Ost, Gent 1981
 K. Scheldeman, A. Ost in Borgerhout, elf herinneringen, Heemkundig handboekje voor de Antwerpse regio, 1985
 René Turkry, Het religieuze werk van A. Ost, Mechelen, 1984
 René Turkry, Beeld van de Kempen. 100 jaar Alfred Ost, Mechelen, 1984
 René Turkry, Floralia. Bloemen-planten door Alfred Ost, Brussel, 1990
 Karl Scheerlinck, De affiches van Alfred Ost - Een voorsmaakje, Verstraelen, Borgerhout, 32 pp., 1995
 Karl Scheerlinck, Alfred Ost 1884-1945 - Oeuvrecatalogus affiches/posters, publ. Pandora/Snoeck Ducaju & Zoon, 1997
 Karl Scheerlinck, Prentbriefkaarten Alfred Ost - Oeuvrecatalogus, publ. Plakkaat & Co Antwerpen, 272 pp. (over 400 illustrations), 2020

External links
 
 artnet.de

1884 births
1945 deaths
People from Antwerp Province
Olympic bronze medalists in art competitions
20th-century Belgian painters
Olympic competitors in art competitions
Art competitors at the 1920 Summer Olympics
Deaths from cancer in Belgium